The Paul Karrer Gold Medal and Lecture is awarded annually or biennially by the University of Zurich to an outstanding researcher in the field of chemistry. It was established in 1959 by a group of leading companies, including CIBA AG, J.R. Geigy, F. Hoffmann-La Roche & Co. AG, Sandoz AG, Société des Produits Nestlé AG and Dr. A. Wander AG, to honour the Swiss organic chemist and Nobel laureate Paul Karrer on his 70th birthday.

The Medal was created by Swiss sculptor Hermann Hubacher; the obverse depicts a relief of Paul Karrer and the reverse is engraved with the words University of Zurich - Paul Karrer Lecture. The lecture itself is delivered at the University of Zurich.

The recipients to date (2015) have represented most of the important research institutions of Europe and the USA and include nine Nobel Prize winners for chemistry or medicine.

Recipients
Source: University of Zurich

See also
List of chemistry awards
Prizes named after people

References

Chemistry awards
Awards established in 1959
Swiss awards